Ivo Lakučs (born 4 March 1979) is a Latvian cyclist. He has competed at two Summer Olympics – 2000 Summer Olympics in the track cycling and in 2008 Summer Olympics in the BMX. As of 2012, he is Māris Štrombergs' coach. Lakučs was born in Valmiera, Latvia.

References

External links
 
 
 
 
 

1979 births
Living people
BMX riders
Latvian male cyclists
Olympic cyclists of Latvia
Cyclists at the 2008 Summer Olympics
Cyclists at the 2000 Summer Olympics
Latvian Academy of Sport Education alumni
People from Valmiera